Jamerson is an American/English surname, and a Brazilian name.

Name
Jamerson Bahia (born 1998), Brazilian footballer

Surname
Notable people with the surname include:

Dave Jamerson, American former professional basketball player
Doug Jamerson (1947–2001), former Education Commissioner of Florida
James Jamerson (1936–1983), American musician
James L. Jamerson, American general
Lefty Jamerson (1900–1980), relief pitcher in Major League Baseball
Natrell Jamerson, American football defensive back

See also
Jemerson